Vincelestes ("Vince's thief") is an extinct genus of actively mobile mammal, that lived in what would be South America during the Early Cretaceous from 130 to 112 mya, existing for approximately .

Description 
Vincelestes neuquenianus is the only species known to date. Specimens were found in La Amarga Formation of southern Neuquén Province, Argentina. The remains of only nine individuals were recovered from this site.

The back teeth of Vincelestes were similar to those of therians in that they were capable of cutting and grinding. This enabled them to process food more efficiently.

Diet
In one study on Mesozoic mammal mandibles, Vincelestes plots with herbivorous and omnivorous taxa.

Phylogeny
Although not the direct ancestor of therians, Vincelestes is important because it gives an idea of what the ancestor of both placental and marsupial mammals might have looked like, and also gives an indication of when these mammals may have originated.

Some studies inversely recovered the genus as an australosphenida, although current thought places Vincelestes as sister to marsupials and placental mammals.

References

Further reading

External links 
 3D skull of Vincelestes

Barremian genus first appearances
Aptian genus extinctions
Early Cretaceous mammals of South America
Cretaceous Argentina
Fossils of Argentina
La Amarga Formation
Fossil taxa described in 1986
Prehistoric mammal genera
Cladotheria